Surnia is a genus of owl that contains a single living species, the northern hawk-owl (Surnia ulula).

Two fossil species are known as well; Surnia capeki and Surnia robusta, both from the Plio-Pleistocene of Europe.

References

 
Bird genera
Bird genera with one living species